Parapercis is a genus of sandperches belonging to the fish family Pinguipedidae.

Species

There are currently 79 recognized species in this genus:
 Parapercis albipinna  J. E. Randall, 2008
 Parapercis albiventer  H.-C. Ho, Heemstra	& Imamura, 2014 (Whitebelly sandperch) 
 Parapercis alboguttata (Günther, 1872) (Whitespot sandsmelt)
 Parapercis allporti Günther, 1876 (Barred grubfish)
 Parapercis atlantica (Vaillant, 1887) 
 Parapercis aurantiaca Döderlein (de), 1884
 Parapercis australis J. E. Randall, 2003
 Parapercis banoni J. E. Randall & Yamakawa, 2006
 Parapercis basimaculata J. E. Randall, Senou & Yoshino, 2008		
 Parapercis bicoloripes Prokofiev, 2010
 Parapercis bimacula G. R. Allen & Erdmann, 2012 (Redbar sandperch)
 Parapercis binivirgata (Waite, 1904) (Redbanded weever)
 Parapercis biordinis G. R. Allen, 1976 
 Parapercis clathrata W. Ogilby, 1910 (Latticed sandperch)
 Parapercis colemani J. E. Randall & Francis, 1993
 Parapercis colias (Forster, 1801) (New Zealand blue cod)
 Parapercis compressa J. E. Randall, 2008 	 
 Parapercis cylindrica (Bloch, 1792) (Cylindrical sandperch)
 Parapercis decemfasciata (V. Franz, 1910) 
 Parapercis diagonalis J. E. Randall, 2008 (Diagonal sandperch)	
 Parapercis diplospilus M. F. Gomon, 1980 (Doublespot grubfish)
 Parapercis dockinsi J. E. McCosker, 1971 
 Parapercis dongshaensis I. S. Chen, T. H. Tsai & S. L. Hsu, 2014 
 Parapercis filamentosa (Steindachner, 1878) (Threadfin sandperch)
 Parapercis flavescens Fourmanoir & Rivaton, 1979 
 Parapercis flavolabiata J. W. Johnson, 2006 (Yellowlip grubfish)
 Parapercis flavolineata J. E. Randall, 2008 (Yellowline sandperch)
 Parapercis fuscolineata Fourmanoir, 1985 
 Parapercis gilliesii F. W. Hutton, 1879 (Yellow weaver)
 Parapercis haackei Steindachner, 1884 (Wavy grubfish)
 Parapercis hexophtalma G. Cuvier, 1829 (Speckled sandperch)
 Parapercis johnsoni H. C. Ho, 2015 (Polynesian sandperch)  
 Parapercis kamoharai L. P. Schultz, 1966 
 Parapercis katoi J. E. Randall, Senou & Yoshino, 2008
 Parapercis kentingensis H.-C. Ho, C. H. Chang & K. T. Shao, 2012 (Kenting sandperch)
 Parapercis lata J. E. Randall & J. E. McCosker, 2002 (Y-barred sandperch)
 Parapercis lineopunctata J. E. Randall, 2003 (Nosestripe sandperch)
 Parapercis lutevittata Y. C. Liao, T. Y. Cheng & K. T. Shao, 2011 (Yellow-striped sandperch)
 Parapercis macrophthalma (Pietschmann, 1911) (Narrow barred grubfish)
 Parapercis maculata Bloch & Schneider, 1801 (Harlequin sandperch)
 Parapercis maramara Sparks & Z. H. Baldwin, 2012	
 Parapercis maritzi M. E. Anderson, 1992
 Parapercis millepunctata Günther, 1860 (Black dotted sandperch)
 Parapercis moki H.-C. Ho & J. W. Johnson, 2013 (Mok's sandperch)  
 Parapercis multifasciata Döderlein (de), 1884 (Gold-birdled sandsmelt)
 Parapercis multiplicata J. E. Randall, 1984 (Redbarred sandperch)
 Parapercis muronis (S. Tanaka (I), 1918)
 Parapercis natator J. E. Randall, Senou & Yoshino, 2008	
 Parapercis nebulosa (Quoy & Gaimard, 1825) (Barred sandperch)
 Parapercis nigrodorsalis J. W. Johnson,  Struthers & Worthington Wilmer, 2014 (Blackfin sandperch) 
 Parapercis okamurai Kamohara, 1960 (Yellow sandperch) 
 Parapercis ommatura D. S. Jordan & Snyder, 1902
 Parapercis pacifica Imamura & Yoshino, 2007
 Parapercis phenax J. E. Randall & Yamakawa, 2006		
 Parapercis pulchella (Temminck & Schlegel, 1843) (Harlequin sandsmelt)
 Parapercis punctata G. Cuvier, 1829 
 Parapercis punctulata G. Cuvier, 1829 (Spotted sandperch)
 Parapercis queenslandica Imamura & Yoshino, 2007 	
 Parapercis ramsayi Steindachner, 1883 (Spotted grubfish)
 Parapercis randalli H.-C. Ho & K. T. Shao, 2010 
 Parapercis robinsoni Fowler, 1929 (Smallscale grubfish)
 Parapercis roseoviridis (C. H. Gilbert, 1905) 
 Parapercis rubromaculata H.-C. Ho, C. H. Chang & K. T. Shao, 2012 (Redspot sandperch)
 Parapercis rufa J. E. Randall, 2001 (Red sandperch)
 Parapercis sagma G. R. Allen & Erdmann, 2012 (Saddled sandperch)
 Parapercis schauinslandii Steindachner, 1900 (Redspotted sandperch)
 Parapercis sexfasciata Temminck & Schlegel, 1843 (Grub fish)
 Parapercis sexlorata J. W. Johnson, 2006 (Sixstrap grubfish)
 Parapercis shaoi J. E. Randall, 2008
 Parapercis signata J. E. Randall, 1984 (Blackflag sandperch)
 Parapercis simulata L. P. Schultz, 1968 
 Parapercis snyderi D. S. Jordan & Starks, 1905 (U-mark sandperch)
 Parapercis somaliensis L. P. Schultz, 1968 (Somali sandperch)
 Parapercis stricticeps (De Vis, 1884) (White-streaked grubfish)
 Parapercis striolata (M. C. W. Weber, 1913) 
 Parapercis tetracantha (Lacépède, 1802) (Reticulated sandperch)
 Parapercis vittafrons J. E. Randall, 2008 (Bandhead sandperch)
 Parapercis xanthogramma Imamura & Yoshino, 2007 	
 Parapercis xanthozona (Bleeker, 1849) (Yellowbar sandperch)

References

Pinguipedidae
Marine fish genera
Taxa named by Pieter Bleeker